In Christian theology, synergism is the belief that salvation involves some form of cooperation between divine grace and human freedom. Synergism is upheld by the Roman Catholic Church, Orthodox Churches, Anabaptist Churches and Methodist Churches. It is an integral part of Arminian theology common in the General Baptist and Methodist traditions.

Synergism stands opposed to monergism (which rejects the idea that humans cooperate with the grace of God), a doctrine most commonly associated with the Reformed Protestant as well as Lutheran traditions, whose soteriologies have been strongly influenced by the North African bishop and Latin Church Father Augustine of Hippo (354–430). Lutheranism, however, confesses a monergist salvation but rejects the notion that anyone is predestined to hell (see ).

Synergism and semipelagianism each teach some collaboration in salvation between God and humans, but semipelagian thought teaches that the beginning half of faith is an act of human will. The Council of Orange (529), Lutheran Formula of Concord (1577), and other local councils each condemned semipelagianism as heresy.

Catholic theology
Synergism, the teaching that there is "a kind of interplay between human freedom and divine grace", is an important part of the salvation theology of the Catholic Church.

The Catholic Church rejects the notion of total depravity: they hold that, even after the Fall, human nature, though wounded in the natural powers proper to it, has not been totally corrupted. In addition, they reject double predestination, the idea that would "make everything the work of an all-powerful divine grace which arbitrarily selected some to be saved and some to be damned, so that we human beings had no freedom of choice about our eternal fate".

The Catechism of the Catholic Church teaches that the ability of the human will to respond to divine grace is itself conferred by grace. "By the working of grace the Holy Spirit educates us in spiritual freedom in order to make us free collaborators in his work in the Church and in the world". "The preparation of man for the reception of grace is already a work of grace." "When Catholics say that persons 'cooperate' in preparing for and accepting justification by consenting to God's justifying action, they see such personal consent as itself an effect of grace, not as an action arising from innate human abilities."

Eastern Orthodox theology 
The Eastern Orthodox view of synergism holds that "humans beings always have the freedom to choose, in their personal (gnomic) wills, whether to walk with God or turn from Him", but "what God does is incomparably more important than what we humans do".

"To describe the relation between the grace of God and human freedom, Orthodoxy uses the term cooperation or synergy (synergeia); in Paul's words, 'We are fellow-workers (synergoi) with God' (1 Corinthians iii, 9). If we are to achieve full fellowship with God, we cannot do so without God's help, yet we must also play our own part: we humans as well as God must make our contribution to the common work, although what God does is of immeasurably greater importance than what we do." "For the regenerated to do spiritual good — for the works of the believer being contributory to salvation and wrought by supernatural grace are properly called spiritual — it is necessary that he be guided and prevented [preceded] by grace."

Arminian Protestants share this understanding of synergism, i.e., regeneration as the fruit of free will's cooperation with grace.

Anabaptist theology 

Anabaptists hold to synergism, teaching that "both God and man play real and necessary parts in the reconciling relationship which binds them." Anabaptists have a high view of the moral capacities of humans when "enlivened by the active agency of the Holy Spirit."

Classical Arminian and Wesleyan Arminian theology

Christians who hold to Arminian theology, such as Methodists, believe that salvation is synergistic, being achieved through "divine/human cooperation", each contributing their part to accomplish regeneration (the new birth) in and for the individual, as well as in the believer's sanctification. However, although the individual plays a part in salvation, one cannot either turn to God nor believe on their own as God first draws all persons and implants the desire in their heart to know him (cf. ). After the New Birth, "Christians must do both works of piety and works of mercy in order to move on toward Christian perfection" in cooperation with God's grace. In summation, Methodist (Wesleyan-Arminian) theology teaches that "Christians must grow in God's grace, which first prepares us for belief, then accepts us when we respond to God in faith, and sustains us as we do good works and participate in God's mission."

Arminians believe that all humans are totally corrupted by sin but God grants all sinners prevenient grace (prevenient meaning "coming before"). With this prevenient grace (or with its effects on the fallen human), a person is able to freely choose to place faith in Christ or reject his salvation. If the person accepts it, then God justifies them and continues to give further grace to spiritually heal and sanctify them. This view differs from semipelagianism, which maintains that a human being can begin to have faith without the need for grace. John Wesley explained the Arminian conception of free will, saying, "The will of man is by nature free only to evil. Yet... every man has a measure of free-will restored to him by grace." He continues, "Natural free-will in the present state of mankind, I do not understand: I only assert, that there is a measure of free-will supernaturally restored to every man, together with that supernatural light which 'enlightens every man that comes into the world." Arminians hold that the individual's decision is not the cause of their salvation or loss, but rather that the free response to prevenient grace forms the grounds for God's free decision; the person's decision does not constrain God, but God takes it into consideration when he decides whether to complete the person's salvation or not.

An analogy sometimes cited is based upon , in which Christ states that he stands at the door and knocks, and if anyone opens he will enter in. Arminians assert that Christ comes to each person with prevenient grace, and if they are willing for him to enter, he enters them. Therefore, no one does any of the actual work of saving themselves, because Christ does the work of coming to them in the first place, and if they are willing to follow him, he does the work of entering in, but whether he does so is dependent upon the will of the person (no one, however, could will for Christ to enter if he did not first knock).

Lutheran and Calvinist views

Lutheran theology distinguishes between monergistic salvation and a synergistic damnation. By monergistic salvation, Lutherans mean that saving faith is the work of the Holy Spirit alone, while man is still the uncooperative enemy of God (Rom. 5:8,10). To support their understanding of synergistic damnation, they argue that Scripture states repeatedly that man participates in and bears the responsibility for resisting God's grace of the free gift – not enforced gift – of salvation (ex: Matt. 23:37, Heb. 12:25, Acts 7:51, John 16:9, Heb. 12:15, etc.). Lutherans understand their view to be in contrast to Calvin's monergistic damnation and to Arminius' synergistic salvation. However, Calvinists would take issue with their view being called "monergistic damnation," since they claim to agree with Lutherans and Arminians that mankind alone bears responsibility for their sin and for their rejection of God's worldwide call to repent and be saved.

The difference Lutheranism has with Calvinism and Arminianism, then, lies in how they describe the workings of God's will, fore-ordination, and gracious providence. Lutheranism teaches that God predestines some to salvation but does not predestine others to damnation as God wills that all might be saved (1 Tim 2:3-6, Rom. 11:32, etc.). Lutheran view differs from the Calvinist view that God from eternity actively decrees some to salvation and some to damnation. In this theological determinism, God's predestination logically precedes his foreknowledge of it. Lutheran view differs also with Arminian view that God's predestination is based on divine foreknowledge of men's synergistic acceptance or rejection of salvation. 

For Lutherans, people freely reject God's call to salvation because they refuse his grace since God did not predestine them to salvation. For Arminians, God has only the foreknowledge that they will freely reject his grace. For Calvinists, people freely reject God's call to salvation because God eternally chooses not to place his saving grace upon them so as to magnify the value of his undeserved grace to those whom he does choose.

See also

Arminianism
Dyoenergism
Dyothelitism
Libertarianism (metaphysics)
Molinism
Monergism
Monoenergism
Orthodox Christian theology
Theosis
Total depravity

Notes and references

Citations

Sources

External links
 Prevenient grace (Theopedia)
 Prevenient Grace by Jeff Paton

Christian soteriology
Christian terminology
Arminianism
Lutheran theology
Catholic theology and doctrine